Palmyra, or  is a 2022 Russian war film directed by Andrei Kravchuk, tells about the sappers who work the Russian military operation in Syria.

It was theatrically released on February 17, 2022.

Plot 
The film is set in May, 2016. The film tells about the Russian sappers of the demining detachment who were preparing Palmyra for the concert of the Mariinsky Theatre Orchestra.

Cast 
 Aleksandr Robak as Shaberov
 Pavel Chinaryov as Zhilin
 Aleksandr Metyolkin as Makarsky
 Ekaterina Nesterova as Jamila
 Igor Gordin as Major general
 Polina Pushkaruk as Zhilin's wife
 Vitaliya Korniyenko as Zhilin's daughter
 Anna Potebnya as Shaberov's daughter
 Aleksey Komashko as the groom of Shaberov's daughter

Production

Filming
Principal photography took place in the Republic of Crimea, and was completed in November of that year, with some of the filming done by Syrian film producers who shot outdoor scenes in Palmyra itself for the producers.

References 

2022 films
2020s Russian-language films
2020s war films
Films directed by Andrei Kravchuk
Russian war films
Films about special forces
Films set in Syria
Films shot in Crimea
Films shot in Russia
Films shot in Syria
Films about Russian military operations in Syria